The Bardoka or White Metohian sheep ( - White Sheep of the Dukagjin) is a multi-purpose (milk, meat, wool and research) breed of domesticated sheep in Kosovo.  It is a popular sheep in Kosovo and partially in Montenegro, Serbia and Albania. This breed appears to adaptable to all environmental conditions especially low temperatures.  However, the Bardoka is sensitive to high humidity.

Characteristics
The Bardoka displays white with pink skin.  Both sexes are horned.

Mature rams weigh  and ewes  at maturity. Ewes lactate for approximately 180 days, provide  of milk with about 7.1% milk fat. At birth, rams weigh  and ewes weigh .

References

Sheep breeds originating in Kosovo
Sheep breeds